Oznoz is a subscription video on demand service with the focus on multilingual children's television programming. Oznoz carries a library of 4000 hours of programming on-launch, and exclusive rights to libraries such as Sesame Workshop, Hit Entertainment, and Nelvana in many languages other than English. Oznoz languages include Arabic, Chinese, English, French, Hindi, Korean, Kurdish, Japanese, Persian, Urdu, Spanish, and non-dialogue shows. Oznoz content can be accessed as an over-the-top service through the channel's website and iPad and Android apps.

Distribution
Oznoz is available via website, mobile apps, smart TVs, and other devices. On launch, the service is available to subscribers in Canada and the United States.

Content
The service is oriented primarily towards bilingual families who speak two or more languages. Content includes television series, movies and shorts such as Barney, Thomas the Tank Engine, Bob The Builder, Pingu, Babar, Super Why, 1001 Nights, Franklin, Pororo, Be Ponkickies, Sesame Street, Elmo's World and other original shows from international broadcast partners such as Al Jazeera Children's Channel, TV Tokyo, IRIB and others.

References

External links
 
About Oznoz

Streaming television
Video on demand services
Internet properties established in 2014